James Bond Jr. is an American animated television series based on Ian Fleming's James Bond franchise. It follows the adventures of James Bond's nephew, James Bond Jr.

The series debuted in September 1991 and ran for 65 episodes before ending in March 1992. It is the only television series ever produced based on the Bond franchise.

Background 
This was the second attempt to create an animated series based on the Bond franchise. Bond screenwriter Kevin McClory announced in a February 10, 1988 issue of Variety, that he was working to produce an animated James Bond series called James Bond vs. S.P.E.C.T.R.E., to be produced by an unnamed Dutch company. This series never came to fruition.

In the mean time, Eon Productions began developing what would become James Bond Jr. The show was produced by Murakami-Wolf-Swenson and MGM Television, and debuted on 30 September 1991, with a total of 65 half-hour episodes produced. James Bond Jr was voiced by Corey Burton.

James Bond Jr. was fully sanctioned by (and produced in association with) Danjaq and United Artists, who held the rights to the James Bond property. It was the first attempt to bring the Bond franchise to television since the 1954 live adaptation of Casino Royale. Only a single season was produced.

Plot 
	
While attending prep school at Warfield Academy, James Bond Jr, with the help of his friends IQ (the grandson of Q), and Gordo Leiter (the son of Felix Leiter), fight against the evil terrorist organisation S.C.U.M. (Saboteurs and Criminals United in Mayhem), a SPECTRE-like organization. Expanding on his uncle's famous line, James Bond Jr's catchphrase was "Bond, James Bond... Junior."

The show regularly surpasses the Bond movies in terms of fantastical gadgets, while the violence of the Bond series is nowhere in evidence. 
Jaws, a recurring villain from the films The Spy Who Loved Me and Moonraker, made regular appearances, usually partnered with Nick Nack, a villain from The Man with the Golden Gun, forming a bickering comical duo. Auric Goldfinger also appears, alongside his assistant, Oddjob, from the Goldfinger film. It is revealed Goldfinger has a teenage daughter named Goldie Finger with equally expensive tastes. The only other villain from the films to appear in the show, though one that's very loosely based on his film counterpart is Dr. No, who is depicted as being Asian and having green skin, a common practice at the time in children's media whenever Asian villains are showcased such as Ming the Merciless in Defenders of the Earth and The Mandarin in the 90's Iron Man TV series. Several episode titles parodied the titles of Bond films such as Live and Let’s Dance and Rubies Aren't Forever.

Characters 
The main characters consist of James Bond Jr., his friends, several featured members of the Warfield Academy staff, and Trevor Noseworthy IV, are the series regulars, appearing in almost every episode of the series. Sometimes only two or three of Jr.'s friends will accompany him on an adventure, leaving the others behind at Warfield to create a B-plot. These plots normally revolve around Trevor's misguided attempts to get James into trouble.

Main characters 
 James Bond Jr. (voiced by Corey Burton) — The teenage nephew of MI6 agent, James Bond 007. He attends Warfield Academy with friends who aid him in his missions. Romance is occasionally hinted at between Bond and Tracy Milbanks.
 Horace 'I.Q.' Boothroyd III (voiced by Jeff Bennett) — The grandson of Q (007's gadget inventor), he is a scientific genius and one of James' best friends. Quick-witted and highly logical, he is responsible for developing and building the gadgets that help James defeat agents of S.C.U.M.  He is mistakenly called Ike in the Italian edition.
 Tracy Milbanks (voiced by Mona Marshall)  — Daughter of Bradford Milbanks and one of Jr's closest friends. She regularly accompanies James on his missions. Bossy and quick-tempered, Tracy sometimes betrays her feelings for James Bond Jr. Her first name is a reference to 007's late wife, Tracy Bond
 Gordon "Gordo" Leiter (voiced by Jan Rabson) — The tanned, blonde, athletic "strong fist" of the group and one of James Bond Jr's friends. Californian Gordo is also kindly and amiable. The son of 007's CIA associate and friend Felix Leiter, he never backs down when his comrades need force to solve their problems.
 Phoebe Farragut (voiced by Susan Silo) — Tracy's best friend and the daughter of a rich businessman. She makes no secret of her crush on James, although the feelings are never reciprocated, filling the niche filled by Miss Moneypenny in the adult Bond films.
 Trevor Noseworthy IV (voiced by Simon Templeman) — He comes from a wealthy family, and has an inflated sense of superiority and self-importance. Arrogant, egocentric and spiteful, as well as cowardly and fearful, he constantly plans to get Bond Jr. into trouble, hoping for him to be expelled from Warfield, which inevitably backfires.
 Bradford Milbanks (voiced by Julian Holloway) — An ex-RAF officer and father of Tracy Milbanks who now presides over Warfield Academy as the head master. Although serious and rigid, he is a fair and accommodating headmaster and father.
 Burton "Buddy" Mitchell (voiced by Brian Stokes Mitchell) — A former FBI agent and associate of 007, he is the gym teacher of the Academy. Strong and intelligent, he knows more about James Bond Jr.'s activities than he lets on to his colleagues, and often risks his job by allowing James to get into danger. He is James' mentor on the show.

Villains 
There were numerous villains in the series, most of whom worked for S.C.U.M. and made recurring appearances throughout the 65-episode run. Many characters looked nothing like their movie counterparts. All recurring villains in the show are listed here:

 S.C.U.M. - Short for Saboteurs and Criminals United in Mayhem, S.C.U.M. is the evil organization that is the main antagonist of the series.
 Scumlord (voiced by Jeff Bennett) — The mysterious leader of S.C.U.M., never seen outside the shadows. Believed by some to be none other than Ernst Stavro Blofeld. He often relays commands to other S.C.U.M. villains via telescreen. Scumlord has a dog named Scuzzball. Key appearances include The Beginning, Location: Danger, Avalanche Run, Barbella's Big Attraction and The Thing in the Ice, although he made many cameo appearances. Scumlord is never seen outside of his surveillance room. He is always sitting in the dark wearing a trench coat, a fedora hat and sunglasses.
 Jaws (voiced by Jan Rabson) — A dim-witted villain whose trademark steel teeth destroy almost anything he chews. His clothing not only serves as a small source of comedy for the series but also complements his lack of intelligence. He usually acts as a henchman for higher-ranking S.C.U.M. agents and is often paired with Nick Nack. Unlike his movie counterpart, his lower jaw is also metallic, and he is able to talk clearly. In the novelization "A View to a Thrill", it is explained that he was shot in the mouth during a bank robbery and "to save his life, the doctors had given him a set of metal teeth, and motors for jaw muscles. Appearances include The Beginning, Plunder Down Under, Valley of the Hungry Dunes, Never Give a Villain a Fair Shake, No Such Loch, The Inhuman Race, Fountain of Terror, Ship of Terror, Queen's Ransom, Avalanche Run, Barbella's Big Attraction, Invaders from S.C.U.M., Ol' Man River, Catching the Wave, Between a Rock and a Hard Place, Sherlock IQ, Quantum Diamonds, Rubies Aren't Forever, The Thing in the Ice, Monument to S.C.U.M. and Northern Lights.
 Nick Nack (voiced by Jeff Bennett) — A small henchman with a huge chin, Nick Nack is often the butt of "short jokes" from both James Bond Jr. and his villainous "other half", Jaws. Appearances include Valley of the Hungry Dunes, Cruise to Oblivion, The Inhuman Race, Queen's Ransom, Avalanche Run, Barbella's Big Attraction, Invaders from S.C.U.M., Ol' Man River, Catching the Wave, Sherlock IQ, The Thing in the Ice, Goldie Finger at the End of the Rainbow, Monument to S.C.U.M. and Northern Lights.
 Dr. Derange (voiced by Julian Holloway) — This evil scientist with long black hair speaks with a French accent and has an insane passion for all kinds of radioactive materials, mainly plutonium. According to the novelization, "The Eiffel Target", Derange is part man and part machine. He is by far the most frequently appearing villain in the series, appearing in at least sixteen episodes. He is also featured in most of the spin-off material. Appearances include The Eiffel Missile, A Race Against Disaster, The Inhuman Race, It's All in the Timing, Fountain of Terror, Deadly Recall, Red Star One, Invaders from S.C.U.M., A Deranged Mind, The Last of the Tooboos, The Emerald Key, Canine Caper, Weather or Not, Between a Rock and a Hard Place, Quantum Diamonds and Monument to S.C.U.M.
 Skullcap (voiced by Jan Rabson) — A top-ranking S.C.U.M. assassin who is almost always found working for Dr. Derange. His name is derived from the steel headgear encasing the top part of his head. Skullcap is extremely cold and insidious though not particularly cunning. According to the novelization The Eiffel Target, he is Number 17 on Interpol's Most Wanted list, and it was Dr. Derange who crafted his metallic dome after being seriously injured in a robbery. The dome also conducts static electricity. Whenever Skullcap scratches his head, it triggers little sparks. Appearances include The Eiffel Missile, The Inhuman Race, It's All in the Timing, The Last of the Tooboos, The Emerald Key, Weather or Not, Canine Caper and Thor's Thunder.
 Auric Goldfinger (voiced by Jan Rabson) — One of 007's cleverest and most manipulative villains. Whenever there is gold, there is Goldfinger. His schemes are motivated entirely by greed, and he is most often assisted by henchman Odd Job. He was arguably the SCUM villain who was the least altered from his movie counterpart. Appearances include Earth Cracker, Cruise to Oblivion, Goldie's Gold Scam and Killer Asteroid.
 Goldie Finger (voiced by Kath Soucie) — Goldfinger's spoiled and equally crooked daughter, who shares her father's love of gold and his ruthlessness. She often teamed up with Barbella, although she would sometimes aid her father. Appearances include City of Gold, Going for the Gold, Goldie's Gold Scam and Goldie Finger at the End of the Rainbow.
 Oddjob (voiced by Jeff Bennett) — Much like Jaws and Nick Nack, he is seen working for the other villains, especially Goldfinger. He wears an odd-looking purple jumpsuit with red-orange stripes, red and white sneakers, pale green half gloves, a gold necklace bearing the initials OJ, a pale green winter scarf and flying goggles. His trademark razor-sharp hat is also present, although now it is a miniature top hat instead of a bowler hat. Appearances include Earth Cracker, Cruise to Oblivion, Far Out West, A Deranged Mind, Goldie's Gold Scam, Between a Rock and a Hard Place, Killer Asteroid and Garden of Evil.
 Barbella (voiced by Mona Marshall) — A hot-tempered female bodybuilder, Barbella often exhibits superhuman strength. Cunning and cold, she has loyalty for no-one, least of all S.C.U.M., whom she betrays in one episode by attempting to destroy their international headquarters. Barbella often works with Goldie Finger. Appearances include City of Gold, Barbella's Big Attraction, Going for the Gold, A Deranged Mind and Goldie Finger at the End of the Rainbow.
 Dr. No (voiced by Julian Holloway) — One of 007's most fiendish opponents. The animated version differs a lot from the film Dr. No, as he has green skin and cybernetic hands, likely as a result of his defeat at the hands of 007 in the original movie. His accent, costume and mustache have Asiatic themes and many of his schemes involve ninjas, samurai swords and the like. Appearances include A Chilling Affair, Valley of the Hungry Dunes, Appointment in Macau, The Sword of Power, Far Out West, Garden of Evil and No Time to Lose.
 Spoiler (voiced by Michael Gough) — A gravel-voiced S.C.U.M. agent who leads a savage, chain-wielding biker gang. He has worked for various agents including Baron von Skarin, Dr. Derange, and Dr. No. Appearances include Scottish Mist, No Time to Lose and Monument to S.C.U.M.
 Baron Von Skarin (voiced by Julian Holloway) — This wealthy Bavarian baron is also an international terrorist and firearms smuggler. Von Skarin is cold and cruel but never neglects his elegant appearance. He is often seen reporting directly to Scumlord and is apparently one of his more favored agents. Appearances include Live and Let's Dance, Dance of the Toreadors, Scottish Mist, Catching the Wave, Sherlock IQ, Rubies Aren't Forever and Northern Lights.
 Walker D. Plank (voiced by Ed Gilbert) — A pirate with a hook hand, eye-patch, a peg leg and a talking parrot that also has an eye-patch and a peg-leg. His schemes are invariably nautical and involve pillage, plunder, and domination of all the oceans in the world. He seemed to be inspired by Karl Stromberg; with one episode showing his plot foiled in a manner akin to The Spy Who Loved Me. Appearances include Plunder Down Under, Nothing to Play With, Never Give a Villain a Fair Shake, No Such Loch, Ship of Terror, Queen's Ransom, S.C.U.M. on the Water, Ol' Man River, Danger Train and Thor's Thunder.
 Bilge and Pump — A pair of sinister seafaring sidekicks, often found instigating criminality on behalf of Captain Plank. Appearances include No Such Loch and S.C.U.M. on the Water.
 Ms. Fortune (voiced by Susan Silo) — A wealthy criminal aristocrat, Ms. Fortune's wealth never prevents her from attempting to acquire more, through highly illegitimate means. She was an original villainess for the series, though her conspiracies to gain financial domination suggest she was a feminine version of Goldfinger. Appearances include Fountain of Terror, Mindfield, The Heartbreak Caper, There But For Ms. Fortune and Danger Train.
 Snuffer (voiced by Jan Rabson) — Ms. Fortune's crooked and deeply unpleasant butler and accomplice. He ends every sentence with 'ma'am', unless he is ordered by Ms. Fortune to wait on her male SCUM allies, in which case he will end a sentence with "sir". Appearances include Fountain of Terror, Mindfield, The Heartbreak Caper, There But For Ms. Fortune and Danger Train.
 The Chameleon (voiced by Alan Oppenheimer) — This dangerous criminal is a facial shapeshifter due to nano-technologic mechanisms implanted under the skin on his face. Cunning and sly, he is a villain to be feared. Appearances include The Chameleon, Red Star One and The Art of Evil.
 Tiara Hotstones (voiced by Mona Marshall) — This jewel-loving mercenary shares a rapport with James Bond Jr. Despite being ruthless, she is inclined to pursue only jewels and money rather than power or world domination. Appearances include Dance of the Toreadors, Rubies Aren't Forever and Dutch Treat.
 Maximillion Cortex — A diminutive villain with a very large brain. Cortex is very wealthy but is always looking for ways to increase that wealth. Appearances include Lamp of Darkness and Leonardo da Vinci's Vault.
 Leftbrain and Rightbrain  — Cortex's assistants, they are a pair of overweight halfwits whose size and intelligence counter those of their boss. While similar in appearance and completely inseparable, they are not related. Appearances include Lamp of Darkness and Leonardo da Vinci's Vault.
 The Worm (voiced by Jan Rabson) — The only recurring villain in the series not to be associated with S.C.U.M., The Worm is a first-rate terrorist and hypochondriac with an intense dislike of sunlight, making most of his plans taking place deep underground. Appearances include A Worm in the Apple and Pompeii and Circumstance.

Bond girls 
In most episodes James Bond Jr. encounters guest women, whom he is often forced to rescue. Following in the 007 tradition, many of their names are based on puns or double entendres, although they are less salacious than the parent series. Some of the more notable include:

 Lotta Dinaro — Daughter of an archaeologist in search of El Dorado. They are both kidnapped by Oddjob and Goldfinger in the episode Earthcracker.
 Lt. Shelley Kaysing — A US Army lieutenant whom the Chameleon attempts to assassinate to further his plan to steal a secret army device in the episode The Chameleon.
 Marcie Beaucoup (voiced by Kath Soucie) — A French spy who encounters James Bond Jr. on a hovercraft. She and Bond are captured by Dr. Derange and Skullcap and must escape from the Eiffel Tower before a missile is launched killing them both in the episode The Eiffel Missile.
 Terri Firma — The daughter of a leading seismologist, she is forced to work for Walker D. Plank and Jaws when her father is kidnapped in the episode Never Give a Villain a Fair Shake.
 Hayley Comet — A student at Warfield whose professor father is kidnapped by agents of S.C.U.M. disguised as aliens from outer space in the episode Invaders from S.C.U.M.
 Wendy Day — A weather forecaster who assists James in preventing Doctor Derange from carrying out his plot to take control of the weather in the episode Weather or Not.
 Sgt. Victoria Province — A mountie whom James befriends in Toronto. She assists him in foiling Baron von Skarin's plan to cut electrical power to the city in the episode Northern Lights.
 Princess Yasmine (voiced by Sheryl Bernstein) — Daughter of the sheikh of Al-Khaline who is taken captive by Dr. No along with her father's water for ransom. She is freed by James Bond Jr. and they both flood the facility, sabotaging Dr. No's operation in the episode Valley of the Hungry Dunes.

Episodes

Merchandise

Board game 
A board game, James Bond Jr. The Game, was released by Crown and Andrews, the plot of which was to try to prevent the launch of nuclear missile. Players collected computer disks, in order to deactivate the missile, while watching out for SCUM agents.

Diecast vehicles 
Three diecast toy vehicles was produced by ERTL in 1992: James' Sports Car, Warfield Van and the SCUM Helicopter.

Toy line 
The James Bond Jr. toy line was manufactured by Hasbro.

Voice actors

Principal voice actors 
 Corey Burton — James Bond Jr.
 Jeff Bennett — Horace "IQ" Boothroyd III, Scumlord, Nick Nack, Oddjob
 Julian Holloway — Bradford Milbanks, Dr. Derange, Dr. No, Baron Von Skarin
 Mona Marshall — Tracy Milbanks, Barbella, Tiara Hotstones
 Brian Stokes Mitchell — Coach Burton "Buddy" Mitchell
 Jan Rabson — Gordon "Gordo" Leiter, Auric Goldfinger, Jaws, Snuffer, Worm, Skullcap
 Susan Silo — Phoebe Farragut, Miss Fortune
 Simon Templeman — Trevor Noseworthy IV

Additional voices 

 Eddie Barth — 
 Sheryl Bernstein — Princess Yasmine
 Susan Blu — 
 Susan Boyd — 
 Hamilton Camp — 
 Jennifer Darling —  Irma Langinstein
 Mari Devon — 
 Jane Downs — 
 Paul Eiding — 
 Jeannie Elias — 
 Lea Floden — 
 Pat Fraley —  Burne Thompson
 Linda Gary — 
 Ellen Gerstell — 
 Ed Gilbert — Captain Walker D. Plank

 Rebecca Gilchrist — 
 Michael Gough — Dr. Veerd, Ian Watt, Spoiler
 Gaille Heidemann — Matron
 Vicki Juditz — 
 Matt K. Miller — 
 Pat Musick — 
 Alan Oppenheimer — The Chameleon, Lex Illusion
 Samantha Paris — 
 Tony Pope — 
 Robert Ridgely — 
 Maggie Roswell — 
 Kath Soucie — Goldie Finger, Barbella, Mercie Beaucoup 
 B.J. Ward — 
 Jill Wayne —

Crew 
 Susan Blu — Dialogue Director
 Cindy Akers — Assistant Dialogue Director

Home media releases 
As with most animated series, a large number of episodes were only broadcast and never commercially released. Some episodes were only commercially released in the US, and some episodes were only commercially released in the UK.

UK VHS

US VHS

Books

Novelisations by John Peel 
In 1992, Puffin Books published six novels based on the James Bond Jr. animated television show. The books were written by John Peel under the pseudonym John Vincent, and were based on episodes from the television run.

Buzz Books adaptations by Caryn Jenner 
In the UK, four of the TV episodes were adapted into a young children's series by Buzz Books. Although the plots were basically the same, the books were much shorter and sometimes featured different characters from the TV show. The only villains never to appear in these books were Dr. No and Walker D. Plank.

Other books 
These books are not part of a series.

Marvel Comics books 
James Bond Jr. had a limited 12 issue run with Marvel Comics spanning from January 1992 to December 1992. The first five stories were lifted directly from the TV series, but the other seven were original stories. The writers were Cal Hamilton and Dan Abnett, and the artists were Mario Capaldi, Colin Fawcett, Adolfo Buylla, and Bambos Georgioli.

Video game 
James Bond Jr. had two video games based on the series, published by THQ in 1992 for the NES and the Super NES (the former developed by Eurocom and the latter developed by Gray Matter).

See also 

 Young Bond
 Alex Rider
 Jimmy Coates
 CHERUB
 Henderson's Boys
 Cody Banks
 Spy School
 Outline of James Bond
 Jonny Quest

References

External links 
 James Bond Jr. at Metro-Goldwyn-Mayer via Wayback Machine
 

Literary characters introduced in 1967
1990s American animated television series
1991 American television series debuts
1992 American television series endings
1991 video games
American children's animated action television series
American children's animated adventure television series
American children's animated science fiction television series
Child versions of cartoon characters
English-language television shows
James Bond
James Bond video games
Nintendo Entertainment System games
Super Nintendo Entertainment System games
Animated television shows based on films
Television series by CBS Studios
Television series by MGM Television
Eurocom games
Television series by Claster Television
Espionage television series